The 2009–10 UC Santa Barbara Gauchos men's basketball team represented the University of California, Santa Barbara during the 2009–10 college basketball season. They were led by head coach Bob Williams in his 12th season at UCSB. The Gauchos were members of the Big West Conference and played their home games at the UC Santa Barbara Events Center, also known as The Thunderdome.

They finished the season 20–10, 12–4 in Big West play to win a share of the regular season championship. As the No. 1 seed in the Big West tournament, they defeated UC Davis and Long Beach State to earn the conference's automatic bid to the NCAA tournament. As a No. 15 seed in the Midwest Region, they lost in the first round to No. 2-seeded and No. 5-ranked Ohio State.

Previous season 
The Gauchos finished the 2008–09 season 16–15, 8–8 in Big West play to finish in a tie for fourth place. As the No. 4 seed in the Big West tournament, they beat Cal State Fullerton before losing to top-seeded Cal State Northridge.

Roster
Source

Schedule and results

|-
!colspan=9 style=|Exhibition

|-
!colspan=9 style=| Regular season

|-
!colspan=9 style=|Big West tournament

|-
!colspan=9 style=|NCAA tournament

References

Uc Santa Barbara
Uc Santa Barbara
UC Santa Barbara Gauchos men's basketball seasons